The 2016 CFU Club Championship was the 18th edition of CFU Club Championship, the annual international club football competition in the Caribbean region, held amongst clubs whose football associations are affiliated with the Caribbean Football Union (CFU). The top three teams in the tournament qualified for the 2016–17 CONCACAF Champions League. Central were the defending champions, having won the 2015 CFU Club Championship, and successfully defended their title, defeating fellow Trinidadian side W Connection in the final for the second straight year.

Teams

The tournament was open to all league champions and runners-up from each of the 31 CFU member associations, once their competition ended on or before the end of 2015.

A total of 14 teams from 8 CFU associations entered the competition. This is the first CFU Club Championship to feature teams from the Dominican Republic, with Atlético Pantoja and Atlántico both participating.

Notes

Schedule

The Group C matches were delayed from the original dates of 24–28 February 2016 due to the Jamaican general election on 25 February.

Preliminary round
In the preliminary round, the 14 teams were divided into two groups of four teams and two groups of three teams, consisting of two league champions and either one or two league runners-up. Each group was played on a round-robin basis, hosted by one of the teams at a centralized venue. The winners of each group advanced to the final round.

Group 1
Host venue: Ato Boldon Stadium, Couva, Trinidad and Tobago (all times UTC−4)

Group 2
Host venue: Stade Sylvio Cator, Port-au-Prince, Haiti (all times UTC−5)

Group 3
Host venue: Montego Bay Sports Complex, Montego Bay, Jamaica (all times UTC−5)

Group 4
Host venue: Estadio Quisqueya, Santo Domingo, Dominican Republic (all times UTC−4)

Final round
In the final round, the four teams played matches on a knock-out basis, hosted by one of the teams at a centralized venue. The semi-finals matchups were:
Winner Group 1 vs. Winner Group 4
Winner Group 2 vs. Winner Group 3

The semi-final winners played in the final, while the losers played in the third place match.

The CFU announced on 18 March 2016 that Don Bosco were chosen as the final round host, with the host venue being the Stade Sylvio Cator in Port-au-Prince, Haiti (all times UTC−5).

Bracket

Semi-finals
Winners qualified for the 2016–17 CONCACAF Champions League.

Third place match
Winner qualified for the 2016–17 CONCACAF Champions League.

Final

Top scorers

Awards

References

External links
CFU Club Championship, CFUfootball.org

2016
1
2016–17 CONCACAF Champions League